Fomichyov or Fomichev ( or Фомичев) is a Russian masculine surname, its feminine counterpart is Fomichyova or Fomicheva. It may refer to:

Aleksandr Fomichyov (born 1979), Russian football player
Alexander Fomichev (born 1979), Russian ice hockey goaltender
Elena Fomicheva (born 1987), Russian classical pianist, soloist and accompanist
Ilya Fomichev, Kazakhstani footballer
Klavdia Fomicheva (1917–1958), Russian aviator
Konstantin Fomichev (born 1977), Russian sprint canoer
Mikhail Fomichyov (1911–1987), Tank brigade commander
Valery Fomichev (born 1988), Belarusian football player
Vladimir Fomichyov (born 1960), Russian football player
 (born 1954), Kazakhstani football player
Vyacheslav Fomichyov (born 1965), Russian politician

Russian-language surnames